Alfred Wilcox VC (16 December 1884 – 30 March 1954), was an English recipient of the Victoria Cross, the highest and most prestigious award for gallantry in the face of the enemy that can be awarded to British and Commonwealth forces. Until 2006, he was the only recipient of the Victoria Cross whose exact resting place was unknown.

He was 33 years old, and a lance-corporal in the 2/4th Battalion, The Oxfordshire and Buckinghamshire Light Infantry, British Army during the First World War when the following deed took place for which he was awarded the VC.

On 12 September 1918 near Laventie, France, when his company was held up by enemy machine-gun fire at short range, Lance-Corporal Wilcox rushed to the nearest enemy gun, bombing it and killing the gunner. Being then attacked by an enemy bombing party, the corporal picked up enemy stick bombs and led his company against the next gun, finally capturing and destroying it. Then, left with only one man he continued bombing and captured a third gun. Going up the trench, bombing as he went, he captured a fourth gun and then returned to his platoon.

A nephew was Charles Wilcox GC. In 2006 his nephew John Wilcox, who had attended his Uncle's funeral in 1954, helped historian Chris Sutton in locating his grave in Aston Church. A service was held, and a memorial unveiled on 12 September 2006, 88 years to the day after he captured the guns.

He is named prominently on the front panel of the plinth unveiled at the new student accommodation in James Wolfe Road, Oxford on 16 August 2019 at the site of Cowley Barracks.

References

Monuments to Courage (David Harvey, 1999)
The Register of the Victoria Cross (This England, 1997)

External links
Soldiers of Oxfordshire Museum
Location of grave and VC medal (Birmingham)
VC medal auction details

1884 births
1954 deaths
Military personnel from Birmingham, West Midlands
Oxfordshire and Buckinghamshire Light Infantry soldiers
British World War I recipients of the Victoria Cross
British Army personnel of World War I
Royal Warwickshire Fusiliers soldiers
British Yeomanry soldiers
British Army recipients of the Victoria Cross
Burials in Warwickshire